The Hanson Place Central United Methodist Church is a Methodist cathedral in the Fort Greene neighborhood of Brooklyn, New York City, located on the northwest corner of Hanson Place and St. Felix Street, adjacent to the Williamsburgh Savings Bank Tower. The church is the third Methodist church on the site. The present structure was built in 1929–1931, and its architectural style has been called "Gothic restyled in modern dress, an exercise in massing brick and tan  terra cotta that might be called cubistic Art Moderne."

The church's street level features retail stores, and it is also listed as the headquarters for the Boy Scouts in Brooklyn.

As of 2010, Hanson Place Central hosts a midday inspirational service for all members of the downtown Brooklyn community daily at 12 noon. They work to engage all members of their surrounding community. They also have a food pantry open to the public in need.

The structure is now abandoned, covered in scaffolding and filled with black mold and dust on the inside.

The church is located within the Brooklyn Academy of Music Historic District, which was created in 1978 by the New York City Landmarks Preservation Commission.

History
The first Methodist church on the site was erected in 1857 on land purchased the year before; prior to that the land had been part of a farm, and then passed through a number of hands after the farm was sub-divided.  The Hanson Place Methodist Church, which could accommodate 800 people and had a Sunday school in the basement, was dedicated on January 3, 1858. A new Sunday school building was constructed in 1860, and a parsonage in 1863.  By 1872 a larger church was required, which started construction in 1873 and was dedicated on January 4, 1874.

In 1927, the Hanson Place church merged with the Summerfield Methodist Church and the Fleet Street Methodist Church to create the Central Methodist Episcopal Church.  The new combined congregation planned on building a new church, and purchased a site for it, but when the 1874 building was condemned by the Department of Buildings as unsafe for occupation due to damage done by subway construction underneath it, the parish decided instead to replace the condemned building and keep the church on the same site.

The Church built again on the same site and the architecturally significant church was completed in 1931. The architecture firm of Halsey, McCormick, and Helmer designed the Modern Gothic/Art Moderne style church, as well as the adjacent landmarked Williamsburgh Savings Bank Tower.

The new, red-brick, Gothic revival structure has a base of granite and is trimmed with stone of a color lighter than the brick.  The facade is dominated by the double entry doors within a Gothic arch, and myriad symbolic carvings.

References 
Notes

External links

1857 establishments in New York (state)
19th-century Methodist church buildings in the United States
Churches completed in 1930
Methodist churches in New York City
Churches in Brooklyn
Closed churches in New York City
Fort Greene, Brooklyn